Mahmoud Sami Al Baroudi (June 11, 1839 – December 11, 1904) was a significant Egyptian political figure, and a prominent poet. He served as 5th Prime Minister of Egypt from 4 February, 1882 until 26 May, 1882. He was known as rab alseif wel qalam رب السيف و القلم ("lord of sword and pen"). His father belonged to an Ottoman-Egyptian family while his mother was a Greek woman who converted to Islam upon marrying his father.

Works 
He wrote more than 370 poems, for instance: " Everyone who is alive, will die." (In Arabic:كُلّ حيّ سيموت).

References

External links
 

1839 births
1904 deaths
19th-century prime ministers of Egypt
19th-century Egyptian poets
19th-century male writers
Prime Ministers of Egypt
Egyptian male poets
Egyptian pashas
Greek Muslims
People from the Ottoman Empire of Greek descent
Egyptian people of Greek descent